There are numerous species of molluscs living in the wild in Bulgaria. This list covers only the non-marine species.

Freshwater gastropods

Neritidae
 Theodoxus danubialis (C. Pfeiffer, 1828)
 Theodoxus fluviatilis (Linnaeus, 1758)
 Theodoxus pallasi Linholm, 1924
 Theodoxus transversalis (C. Pfeiffer, 1828)

Viviparidae
 Viviparus acerosus (Bourguignat, 1862)
 Viviparus contectus (Millet, 1813)
 Viviparus viviparus (Linnaeus, 1758)

Melanopsidae
 Melanopsis parreyssi Philippi, 1847
 Esperiana (Esperiana) esperi (A. Férussac, 1823)
 Esperiana (Microcolpia) daudebartii (Prevost, 1821)
 Holandriana holandrii (C. Pfeiffer, 1828)

Pyrgulidae
 Turricaspia (Laevicaspia) lincta (Milaschewitch, 1908)
 Turricaspia (Clessiniola) variabilis (Eichwald, 1838)

Bithyniidae
 Bithynia (Bithynia) danubialis Glöer et Georgiev, 2012
 Bithynia (Bithynia) tentaculata (Linnaeus, 1758)
 Bithynia (Codiella) rumelica Wohlberedt, 1911

Bythinellidae
 Bythinella aneliae Georgiev et Stoycheva, 2011
 Bythinella angelovi Glöer et Georgiev, 2011
 Bythinella dedovi Glöer et Georgiev, 2011
 Bythinella dierckingi Glöer et Georgiev, 2011
 Bythinella elenae Glöer et Georgiev, 2011
 Bythinella fabiae Georgiev, Schneppart & Dedov, 2022
 Bythinella gloeeri Georgiev, 2009
 Bythinella hansboetersi Glöer et Pešiæ, 2006
 Bythinella izvorica Glöer et Georgiev, 2011
 Bythinella kleptuzica Glöer et Georgiev, 2011
 Bythinella margritae Glöer et Georgiev, 2011
 Bythinella markovi Glöer et Georgiev, 2009
 Bythinella ravnogorica Glöer et Georgiev, 2009
 Bythinella rhodopensis Glöer et Georgiev, 2011
 Bythinella rilaensis Georgiev et Glöer, 2013
 Bythinella slaveyae Glöer et Georgiev, 2011
 Bythinella smolyanica Glöer et Georgiev, 2011
 Bythinella srednogorica Glöer et Georgiev, 2009
 Bythinella stoychevae Georgiev, 2011
 Bythinella temelkovi Georgiev & Glöer, 2014
 Bythinella valkanovi Glöer et Georgiev, 2011
 Bythinella vidinovae Dedov, Taseva & Georgiev, 2021
 Bythinella walkeri Glöer et Georgiev, 2009
 Strandzhia bythinellopenia Georgiev et Glöer, 2013

Hydrobiidae
 Balkanica yankovi Georgiev, 2011
 Balkanospeum schniebsae (Georgiev, 2011)
 Caspia milae Boeters, Glöer, Georgiev & Dedov, 2015
 Cavernisa zaschevi (Angelov, 1959)
 Devetakia apostoloui Georgiev, Dedov & Taseva, 2022
 Devetakia krushunica Georgiev et Glöer, 2011
 Devetakia mandrica Georgiev, 2012
 Devetakia pandurskii Georgiev et Glöer, 2011
 Devetakia veselinae Georgiev & Glöer, 2015
 Devetakiola devetakium (Georgiev et Glöer, 2013)
 Gloeria bulgarica Georgiev, Dedov et Varadinova, 2012
 Grossuana angeltsekovi Glöer et Georgiev, 2009
 Grossuana codreanui (Grossu, 1946)
 Grossuana derventica Georgiev et Glöer, 2013
 Grossuana falniowskii Georgiev, Glöer, Dedov & Irikov, 2015
 Grossuana slavyanica Georgiev et Glöer, 2013
 Grossuana thracica Glöer et Georgiev, 2009
 “Hauffenia” lucidula (Angelov, 1967)
 Hydrobia acuta Draparnaud, 1805
 Insignia macrostoma Angelov, 1972
 Kolevia bulgarica Georgiev & Glöer, 2015
 Microstygia deltchevi Georgiev & Glöer, 2015
 Plagigeyeria procerula (Angelov, 1965)
 Pontobelgrandiella angelovi (Pintér, 1968)
 Pontobelgrandiella bachkovoensis (Glöer et Georgiev, 2009)
 Pontobelgrandiella bulgarica (Angelov, 1972)
 Pontobelgrandiella bureschi (Angelov, 1976)
 Pontobelgrandiella delevae (Georgiev & Glöer, 2015)
 Pontobelgrandiella dobrostanica (Glöer et Georgiev, 2009)
 Pontobelgrandiella hessei (A. Wagner, 1927)
 Pontobelgrandiella lomica (Georgiev & Glöer, 2015)
 Pontobelgrandiella maarensis (Georgiev, 2013)
 Pontobelgrandiella nitida (Angelov, 1972)
 Pontobelgrandiella pandurskii (Georgiev, 2011)
 Pontobelgrandiella pussila (Angelov, 1959)
 Pontobelgrandiella stanimirae (Georgiev, 2011)
 Pontobelgrandiella tanevi Georgiev, 2013
 Pontobelgrandiella zagoraensis (Glöer et Georgiev, 2009)
 Radomaniola aytosensis (Georgiev, 2012)
 Radomaniola bulgarica Glöer et Georgiev, 2009
 Radomaniola radostinae (Georgiev, 2012)
 Radomaniola rhodopensis Glöer et Georgiev, 2009
 Radomaniola strandzhica Georgiev et Glöer, 2013
 Stoyanovia stoyanovi (Georgiev, 2013)

Lithoglyphidae
 Lithoglyphus naticoides (C. Pfeiffer, 1828)
 Lithoglyphus pyramidatus von Möllendorf, 1873

Moitessieriidae
 Bythiospeum bechevi Georgiev & Glöer, 2013
 Bythiospeum buresi (A. Wagner, 1928)
 Bythiospeum copiosum (Angelov, 1972)
 Bythiospeum dourdeni Georgiev, 2012
 Bythiospeum iltchoi Georgiev & Glöer, 2015
 Bythiospeum iltchokolevi Georgiev & Glöer, 2015
 Bythiospeum jazzi Georgiev & Glöer, 2013
 Bythiospeum juliae Georgiev & Glöer, 2015
 Bythiospeum kolevi Georgiev, 2013
 Bythiospeum pandurskii Georgiev, 2012
 Bythiospeum simovi Georgiev, 2013
 Iglica acicularis Angelov, 1959

Tateidae
 Potamopyrgus antipodarum (J. E. Gray, 1843)

Valvatidae
 Valvata (Valvata) cristata O. F. Müller, 1774
 Valvata (Tropidina) macrostoma (Mörch, 1864)
 Valvata (Cincinna) piscinalis (O. F. Müller, 1774)
 Borysthenia naticina (Menke, 1845)

Acroloxidae
 Acroloxus lacustris (Linnaeus, 1758)

Lymnaeidae
 Galba truncatula (O. F. Müller, 1774)
 Stagnicola corvus (Gmelin, 1791)
 Stagnicola montenegrinus Glöer et Pešić, 2009
 Stagnicola palustris (O. F. Müller, 1774)
 Stagnicola turricula (Held, 1836)
 Radix auricularia (Linnaeus, 1758)
 Radix balthica (Linnaeus, 1758)
 Radix labiata (Rossmässler, 1835)
 Radix lagotis (Schrank, 1803)
 Myxas glutinosa (O. F. Müller, 1774)
 Lymnaea stagnalis (Linnaeus, 1758)

Physidae
 Physa fontinalis (Linnaeus, 1758)
 Physella acuta (Draparnaud, 1805)
 Aplexa hypnorum (Linnaeus, 1758)

Planorbidae
 Planorbarius corneus (Linnaeus, 1758)
 Planorbis carinatus O. F. Müller, 1774
 Planorbis planorbis (Linnaeus, 1758)
 Anisus (Anisus) leucostoma (Millet, 1813)
 Anisus (Anisus) septemgyratus (Rossmässler, 1835)
 Anisus (Anisus) spirorbis (Linnaeus, 1758)
 Anisus (Disculifer) vortex (Linnaeus, 1758)
 Anisus (Disculifer) vorticulus (Troschel, 1834)
 Bathyomphalus contortus (Linnaeus, 1758)
 Gyraulus (Gyraulus) albus (O. F. Müller, 1774)
 Gyraulus (Torquis) laevis (Alder, 1838)
 Gyraulus (Armiger) crista (Linnaeus, 1758)
 Gyraulus (Lamorbis) piscinarum Bourguignat, 1852
 Hippeutis complanatus (Linnaeus, 1758)
 Segmentina nitida (O. F. Müller, 1774)
 Ferrissia fragilis (Tryon, 1863)
 Ancylus fluviatilis O. F. Müller, 1774
 Ancylus recurvus Martens, 1873

Land gastropods

Aciculidae
 Platyla oedogyra (Paladilhe, 1868)
 Platyla orthostoma Jankiewicz, 1979
 Platyla polita (Hartmann, 1840)

Pomatiidae
 Pomatias elegans (O.F. Müller, 1774)
 Pomatias rivularis (Eichwald, 1829)

Ellobiidae
 Carychium minimum O.F. Müller, 1774
 Carychium tridentatum (Risso, 1826)
 Myosotella myosotis (Draparnaud, 1801)

Succineidae
 Succinea putris (Linnaeus, 1758)
 Succinella oblonga (Draparnaud, 1801)
 Oxyloma elegans (Risso, 1826)
 Oxyloma sarsii (Esmark, 1886)
 Oxyloma dunkeri (L. Pfeiffer, 1865)

Cochlicopidae
 Cochlicopa lubrica (O.F. Müller, 1774)
 Cochlicopa lubricella (Porro, 1838)
 Cochlicopa nitens (Gallenstein, 1852)

Argnidae
 Agardhiella macrodonta (Hesse, 1916)
 Agardhiella parreysii (L. Pfeiffer, 1848)
 Agardhiella rumelica (Hesse, 1916)

Chondrinidae
 Chondrina arcadica (Reinhardt, 1881)
 Chondrina avenacea (Bruguière, 1729)
 Granaria frumentum (Draparnaud, 1801)

Lauriidae
 Lauria cylindracea (Da Costa, 1778)
 Leiostyla schweigeri Götting, 1963

Orculidae
 Orcula zilchi Urbański, 1960
 Orculella bulgarica (Hesse, 1915)
 Pagodulina subdola brabeneci Hudec et Vašatko, 1971
 Sphyradium doliolum (Bruguiere, 1792)

Pupillidae
 Pupilla muscorum (Linnaeus, 1758)
 Pupilla sterri (Voith, 1838)
 Pupilla triplicata (Studer, 1820)

Pyramidulidae
 Pyramidula pusilla (Vallot, 1801)

Spelaeodiscidae
 Aspasita bulgarica Subai & Dedov, 2008
 Aspasita triaria triaria (Rossmässler, 1839)

Truncatellinidae
 Truncatellina claustralis (Gredler, 1856)
 Truncatellina costulata (Nilsson, 1822)
 Truncatellina cylindrica (Férussac, 1807)

Valloniidae
 Acanthinula aculeata (Müller, 1774)
 Vallonia costata O. F. Müller, 1774)
 Vallonia enniensis (Gredler, 1856)
 Vallonia excentrica Sterki, 1892
 Vallonia pulchella (O. F. Müller, 1774)

Vertiginidae
 Vertigo alpestris (Alder, 1830)
 Vertigo angustior Jeffreys, 1830
 Vertigo antivertigo (Draparnaud, 1801)
 Vertigo moulinsiana (Dupuy, 1849)
 Vertigo pusilla O. F. Müller, 1774
 Vertigo pygmaea (Draparnaud, 1801)
 Vertigo substriata (Jeffreys, 1830)

Enidae
 Chondrula macedonica A. J. Wagner, 1915
 Chondrula microtraga (Rossmässler, 1839)
 Chondrula tricuspidata (Küster, 1841)
 Chondrula tridens (Müller, 1774)
 Chondrus zebra tantalus (L. Pfeiffer, 1868)
 Ena montana (Draparnaud, 1801)
 Eubrephulus bicallosus (L. Pfeiffer, 1847)
 Leucomastus kindermanni (L. Pfeiffer, 1853)
 Mastus rossmaessleri (L. Pfeiffer, 1846)
 Mastus carneolus (Mousson, 1863)
 Mastus etuberculatus (Frauenfeld, 1867)
 Merdigera obscura (O. F. Müller, 1774)
 Multidentula ovularis (Olivier, 1801)
 Multidentula squalina (Rossmässler, 1848)
 Pseudochondrula seductilis (Rossmässler, 1846)
 Zebrina detrita (O. F. Müller, 1774)
 Zebrina varnensis (L. Pfeiffer, 1847)

Clausiliidae
 Alinda atanasovi (Urbański, 1964) - with the subspecies atanasovi and kremenensis (Dedov, 2009)
 Alinda biplicata (Montagu, 1803) - with the subspecies biplicata, alibotushensis Dedov, 2009, euptychia (Ehrmann (in Urbański, 1960), irikovi Nordsieck, 2008, karlukovoensis Dedov, 2009, michaudiana (Pfeiffer, 1848) and orientalis Nordsieck, 2008
 Alinda fallax (Rossmässler, 1836)
 Alinda golesnicensis Wagner, 1914
 Alinda vratzatica (Likharev, 1972)
 Alinda wagneri (Wagner, 1911) - with the subspecies wagneri and petrohanica (Urbański, 1969)
 Balea eninskoensis (Irikov, 2006)
 Balea kaeufeli (Brandt, 1961)
 Bulgarica bulgariensis (L. Pfeiffer, 1848) - with the subspecies bulgariensis, intricata (Mousson, 1859) and osmanica (Westerlund, 1884)
 Bulgarica denticulata thessalonica (Rossmässler, 1839)
 Bulgarica fraudigera (Rossmässler, 1839)
 Bulgarica fritillaria (Frivaldszky, 1835)
 Bulgarica gabrovnitsana Ivanov, 2006
 Bulgarica hiltrudae Nordsieck, 1974
 Bulgarica pseudofraudigera Nordsieck, 1973
 Bulgarica trimontsiana Ivanov, 2006
 Bulgarica varnensis (L. Pfeiffer, 1848)
 Bulgarica vetusta (Rossmässler, 1836)
 Bulgarica urbanskii Nordsieck, 1973 - with the subspecies urbanskii and paganella Nordsieck, 1974
 Carinigera buresi Wagner, 1928 - with the subspecies buresi, damjanovi (Likharev, 1972) and dramaensis (Nordsieck, 1977)
 Carinigera schuetti Brandt, 1962
 Clausilia pumila pumila Pfeiffer, 1828
 Cochlodina laminata (Montagu, 1803) - with the subspecies laminata and pardita (Westerlund, 1892)
 Dobatia goettingi (Brandt, 1961)
 Euxina circumdata (Pfeiffer, 1848)
 Euxina persica paulhessei (Lindholm, 1925)
 Galeata schwerzenbachii (Pfeiffer, 1848)
 Idyla castalia boschi Nordsieck, 1973
 Macedonica brabeneci Nordsieck, 1977 - with the subspecies brabeneci and prismatica Dedov, 2012
 Macedonica dobrostanica Irikov, 2012
 Macedonica hartmuti Irikov, 2003
 Macedonica frauenfeldi (Rossmässler, 1856) - with the subspecies regia Nordsieck, 1977, riedeli Urbański, 1977, sigma (Westerlund, 1884) and tau Nordsieck, 1977
 Macedonica marginata (Rossmässler, 1835) - with the subspecies marginata, balcanica (Wagner, 1927), frivaldskyana (Rossmässler, 1839) and major (Rossmässler, 1839)
 Macedonica martae Sajó, 1968
 Macedonica pinteri Sajó, 1968
 Macedonica pirinensis Jaeckel, 1954
 Macedonica zilchi Urbański, 1972
 Mentissela rebeli (Sturany, 1897)
 Micridyla pinteri (Nordsieck, 1973)
 Laciniaria bajula (Schmidt, 1868) - with the subspecies bajula, lunella Nordsieck, 1973 and mursalicae (Urbański, 1969)
 Laciniaria macilenta (Rossmässler, 1842)
 Laciniaria plicata (Draparnaud, 1801) - with the subspecies plicata, kueprijae Nordsieck, 1973 and rhodopendsis Nordsieck, 2008
 Ruthenica filograna (Rossmässler, 1836)
 Serrulina serrulata  (Pfeiffer, 1847)
 Vestia ranojevici ranojevici (Pavlović, 1912)
 Vestia roschitzi (Brancsik, 1890) - with the subspecies neubertiana Dedov, 2010, nordsieckiana (Urbański, 1979) and trigonostoma (Pavlović, 1912)

Achatinidae
 Rumina decollata (Linnaeus, 1758)

Ferussaciidae
 Cecilioides acicula (O. F. Müller, 1774)
 Cecilioides jani (De Betta et Martinati, 1855)
 Cecilioides spelaeus (A. J. Wagner, 1914)

Discidae
 Discus perspectivus (Megerle von Mühlfeld, 1816)
 Discus rotundatus (O. F. Müller, 1774)
 Discus ruderatus (Férussac, 1821)

Helicodiscidae
 Lucilla singleyana (Pilsbry, 1889)

Punctidae
 Punctum pygmaeum (Draparnaud, 1801)

Euconulidae
 Euconulus fulvus (O. F. Müller, 1774)

Gastrodontidae
 Aegopinella pura (Alder, 1830)
 Aegopinella minor (Stabile, 1864)
 Aegopinella nitens (Michaud, 1831)
 Perpolita hammonis (Strøm, 1765)
 Zonitoides nitidus (O. F. Müller, 1774)

Oxychilidae
 Carpathica bielawskii Riedel, 1963
 Carpathica stussineri (Wagner, 1895)
 Daudebardia brevipes (Draparnaud, 1805)
 Daudebardia rufa (Draparnaud, 1805)
 Daudebardia wiktori Riedel, 1967
 Mediterranea depressa (Sterki, 1880)
 Mediterranea inopinatus (Uličný, 1887)
 Mediterranea hydatina (Rossmässler, 1838)
 Morlina glabra (Rossmässler, 1835)
 Morlina urbanskii (Riedel, 1963)
 Oxychilus deilus (Bourguignat, 1857)
 Oxychilus draparnaudi (Beck, 1837)
 Oxychilus translucidus (Mortillet, 1854)
 Schistophallus camelinus (Bourguignat, 1852
 Schistophallus investigatus (Riedel, 1993)

Pristilomatidae
 Vitrea contracta (Westerlund, 1871)
 Vitrea diaphana (Studer, 1820)
 Vitrea neglecta Damjanov and Pintér, 1969
 Vitrea pygmaea (O. Boettger, 1880)
 Vitrea riedeli Damjanov and Pintér, 1969
 Vitrea cf. sturanyi (Wagner, 1907)
 Vitrea subrimata (Reinhardt, 1871)
 Vitrea transsylvanica (Clessin, 1877)
 Vitrea ulrichi Georgiev & Dedov, 2014
 Vitrea vereae Irikov, Georgiev & Riedel, 2004
 Spinophallus uminskii (Riedel, 1960)

Milacidae
 Milax parvulus Wiktor, 1968
 Milax verrucosus Wiktor, 1969
 Tandonia budapestensis (Hazay, 1881)
 Tandonia cristata (Kaleniczenko, 1851)
 Tandonia kusceri (H. Wagner, 1931)
 Tandonia piriniana Wiktor, 1983
 Tandonia pinteri (Wiktor, 1975)
 Tandonia serbica (Wagner, 1931)
 Tandonia totevi (Wiktor, 1975)

Zonitidae
 Balcanodiscus frivaldskyanus (Rossmässler, 1842)

Agriolimacidae
 Deroceras agreste (Linnaeus, 1758)
 Deroceras bulgaricum Grossu, 1969
 Deroceras bureschi (H. Wagner, 1934)
 Deroceras invadens Reise, Hutchinson, Schunack & Schlitt, 2011
 Deroceras laeve (O. F. Müller, 1774)
 Deroceras pageti Grossu, 1972
 Deroceras reticulatum (Müller, 1774)
 Deroceras sturanyi (Simroth, 1894)
 Deroceras thersites (Simroth, 1886)
 Deroceras turcicum (Simroth, 1894)
 Deroceras zilchi Grossu, 1969
 Krynickillus urbanskii (Wiktor, 1971)

Limacidae
 Limacus flavus Linnaeus, 1758
 Limacus maculatus (Kaleniczenko, 1851)
 Limax cinereoniger Wolf, 1803
 Limax conemenosi Boettger, 1882
 Limax maximus Linnaeus, 1758
 Limax macedonicus Hesse, 1928
 Limax punctulatus Sordelli, 1870
 Limax subalpinus Lessona, 1880
 Lehmania brunneri (H. Wagner, 1931)
 Lehmania horezia Grosu & Lupu, 1962
 Lehmania nyctelia (Bourguignat, 1861)
 Malacolimax tenellus (O. F. Müller, 1774)

Boettgerillidae
 Boettgerilla pallens Simroth, 1912

Vitrinidae
 Eucobresia diaphana (Draparnaud, 1805)
 Oligolimax annularis (Studer, 1820)
 Oligolimax reitteri (Boettger, 1880)
 Vitrina pellucida (Müller, 1774)

Arionidae
 Arion fasciatus (Nilsson, 1822)
 Arion hortensis Férussac, 1819
 Arion intermedius Normand, 1852
 Arion silvaticus Lohmander, 1937
 Arion subfuscus (Draparnaud, 1805)
 Arion vulgaris Moquin-Tandon, 1855

Camaenidae
 Fruticicola fruticum (O. F. Müller, 1774)

Helicodontidae
 Lindholmiola girva (Friveldszcky, 1835)
 Lindholmiola pirinensis Jaeckel, 1954
 Soosia diodonta (Férussac, 1821)

Geomitridae
 Candidula rhabdotoides (A. J. Wagner, 1927)
 Cernuella virgata (Draparnaud, 1801)
 Cernuella cisalpina (Rossmässler, 1837)
 Cochlicella acuta (O. F. Müller, 1774)
 Helicopsis striata (O. F. Müller, 1774)
 Helicopsis dejecta (Jan, 1832)
 Helicopsis instabilis (Rossmässler, 1838)
 Xerolenta macedonica Hesse, 1928
 Xerolenta obvia (Menke, 1828)
 Xerolenta spiruloides (A. J. Wagner, 1916)
 Xeropicta krynickii (Krynicki, 1833)
 Xeropicta derbentina (Krynicki, 1836)

Helicidae
 Arianta arbustorum (Linnaeus, 1758)
 Cattania ardica Dedov et Subai, 2006
 Cattania balcanica (Kobelt, 1876)
 Cattania haberhaueri (Sturany, 1897)
 Cattania kattingeri (Knipper, 1941)
 Cattania pelia (Hesse, 1912)
 Cattania polinskii (A. J. Wagner, 1927)
 Cattania rumelica (Rossmässler, 1838)
 Cattania trizona (Rossmassler, 1835)
 Cattania sztolcmani (A. J. Wagner, 1927)
 Caucasotachea vindobonensis (Ferussac, 1821)
 Cornu aspersum (O. F. Müller, 1774)
 Eobania vermiculata (O. F. Müller, 1774)
 Helix albescens Rossmässler, 1839
 Helix figulina Rossmässler, 1839
 Helix lucorum Linnaeus, 1757
 Helix philibinensis Rossmässler, 1839
 Helix pomacella Mousson, 1854
 Helix pomatia Linnaeus, 1758
 Helix thessalica Boettger, 1886

Hygromiidae
 Euomphalia strigella (Draparnaud, 1801)
 Hygromia cinctella (Draparnaud, 1801)
 Monacha claustralis (Menke, 1828)
 Monacha carascaloides (Bourguignat, 1855)
 Monacha cartusiana (Müller, 1774)
 Monacha frequens (Mousson, 1859
 Monacha ocellata (L. Pintér, 1968)
 Monacha oshanovae I. Pintér & L. Pintér, 1970
 Monacha ovularis (Bourguignat, 1855)
 Monacha solidior (Mousson, 1873)
 Monacha venusta (L. Pintér, 1968)
 Monachoides incarnatus (O. F. Müller, 1774)
 Pseudotrichia rubiginosa (Schmidt, 1853)
 Xerocampylaea erjaveci (Brusina, 1870)

Freshwater bivalves
Cyrenidae
 Corbicula fluminea (O. F. Müller, 1774)

Dreissenidae
 Dreissena polymorpha (Pallas, 1771)

Sphaeriidae
 Musculium lacustre (O. F. Müller, 1774)
 Pisidium amnicum (O. F. Müller, 1774)
 Pisidium casertanum (Poli, 1791)
 Pisidium globulare Clessin, 1873
 Pisidium henslowanum (Sheppard, 1823)
 Pisidium milium Held, 1836
 Pisidium moitessierianum (Paladilhe, 1866)
 Pisidium nitidum Jenyns, 1832
 Pisidium obtusale (Lamarck, 1818)
 Pisidium personatum Malm, 1855
 Pisidium pseudosphaerium Schlesch, 1947
 Pisidium subtruncatum Malm, 1855
 Pisidium supinum A. Schmidt, 1851
 Pisidium tenuilineatum Stelfox, 1918
 Sphaerium cornium (Linnaeus, 1758)
 Sphaerium nucleus (Studer, 1820)
 Sphaerium rivicola (Lamarck, 1818)

Unionidae
 Sinanodonta woodiana (Lea, 1834)

See also
 Fauna of Bulgaria

Lists of molluscs of surrounding countries:
 List of non-marine molluscs of Romania
 List of non-marine molluscs of Serbia
 List of non-marine molluscs of the Republic of Macedonia
 List of non-marine molluscs of Greece
 List of non-marine molluscs of Turkey

References

Further reading 
  Damjanov S. & Likharev I. (1975). Fauna Bulgarica, 5. Terrestrial snails (Gastropoda terrestria). Marin Drinov Publ., Sofia, 425 pp.
 Dedov I. (1998). "Annotated check-list of the Bulgarian terrestrial snails (Mollusca, Gastropoda)". Linzer Biol. Beitr. 30(2): 745-765.
  Hubenov Z. (2005). Malacofaunistic diversity of Bulgaria. In: Petrova A. (ed.) Current state of Bulgarian biodiversity – problems and perspectives. Bulgarian Bioplatform, Sofia, 199-246.
 Hubenov Z. (2007). "Fauna and Zoogeography of Marine, Freshwater and Terrestrial Mollusks (Mollusca) in Bulgaria". 141-198. In: Fet V. & Popov A. (eds.) Biogeography and ecology of Bulgaria. Monographiae Biologicae 82. .
 Wiktor A. (1983). "The slugs of Bulgaria (Arionidae, Milacidae, Limacidae, Agriolimacidae – Gastropoda, Stylommatophora)". Annales Zoologici 37(3): 71-206.

Bulgaria
Lists of biota of Bulgaria
Bulgeria
Bulgaria